is a passenger railway station in located in the city of Higashiōmi,  Shiga Prefecture, Japan, operated by the private railway operator Ohmi Railway.

Lines
Nagatanino Station is served by the Ohmi Railway Main Line, and is located 27.5 rail kilometers from the terminus of the line at Maibara Station.

Station layout
The station consists of a single side platform serving one bi-directional track. There is no station building, but only a rain shelter on the platform itself. The station is unattended.

Platforms

Adjacent stations

History
Nagatanino Station was opened on December 27, 1916.

Passenger statistics
In fiscal 2019, the station was used by an average of 80 passengers daily (boarding passengers only).

Surroundings
 Imabori Hiyoshi Shrine
 Nagao Shrine

See also
List of railway stations in Japan

References

External links

 Ohmi Railway official site 

Railway stations in Japan opened in 1916
Railway stations in Shiga Prefecture
Higashiōmi